Walkerton is a Town in the Canadian province of Ontario, located within and governed by the municipality of Brockton. It is the site of Brockton's municipal offices and the county seat of Bruce County.  It is located on the Saugeen River, at the junction of King's Highway 9 and formerly King's Highway 4 and is 75 km southwest of Owen Sound. As of 2011, the town had 4,967 people in the community.

On January 1, 1999, Walkerton became part of the Municipality of Brockton. The town is notable for the 2000 Walkerton E. coli outbreak.

History
Walkerton was originally part of Brant County and was first settled in 1849 by William Jasper and Edward Boulton who farmed to the east of the river. Other settlers from the same era included John Lundy, Moses Stewart and Thomas Bilkie who farmed to the west of the river. Joseph Walker arrived from Ireland in 1850 and is considered one of the founders of Walkerton. He built both saw mills and flour mills, surveyed the area into a town plot and encouraged businesses to locate here. Years later, Walker was the reeve of Brant for several terms, and was elected as the first mayor or Walkerton.

Although Walkerton was never incorporated as a village, it became a town in 1871, with a population of just under 1000. That increased to 2,604 by 1881, and to 3,061 by 1891 thanks to the arrival of the railroad which enabled the locals to ship their grain. The population dropped to 2,971 by 1901.

2000 fatal water supply contamination

Sports
Walkerton is home to a Junior C hockey team, the Walkerton Hawks, and a Senior A hockey team, the Walkerton Capitals.

Education
Walkerton has two high schools: Walkerton District Community School (K–12), and Sacred Heart High School. Walkerton also has an elementary school, St. Teresa of Calcutta Catholic School.

Notable people
 Tubby Schmalz (1916–1981), Canadian ice hockey administrator, first commissioner of the Ontario Major Junior Hockey League
 Andrew Clyde, United States Representative
 Samuel Lewis Honey, VC, DCM, MM (9 February 1894 – 30 September 1918) was a soldier in the Canadian Expeditionary Force, and posthumous recipient of the Victoria Cross, the highest military award for    gallantry in the face of the enemy given to British and Commonwealth forces, during the First World War. Honey was a graduate of Walkerton District High School.
 David Milne, considered to be one of Canada's foremost painters, was a graduate of Walkerton District High School.
 William Bertram (January 19, 1880 – May 1, 1933) Hollywood actor and film director during the silent-film era 
 Canadian National softball player and two-time Olympian Alison Bradley was almost a graduate of Walkerton District Secondary School.
 Singer-songwriter Esthero lived in Walkerton.
 Laryssa Biesenthal, Canadian rower
Matilda Dodge Wilson (October 19, 1883 – September 19, 1967) was born in Walkerton to George and Margaret Rausch (née Glinz). Around 1885, they moved to Detroit. Matilda would marry auto pioneer John Francis Dodge and become one of the wealthiest women in the world after his death. With her second husband, she built the National Historic Landmark Meadow Brook Hall in 1929 and founded Oakland University on her estate.
Jeannette Durno (1879-1963), pianist and music educator based in Chicago; born in Walkerton

Trivia
The town was rumoured to have been placed in the Guinness World Records for having a church on each corner of the jail and courthouse complex.  This is proven, and it has been covered by Ripley's Believe It or Not!.

References

External links

Town web site

Former towns in Ontario
Communities in Bruce County